Neendakara is a suburb of Kollam city in Kerala, India. The twin harbours, Neendakara and Shakthikulangara are located here. |url=https://www.tourmyindia.com/states/kerala/neendakara-port-kollam.html  Trawling ban and withdrawal of the state official start from Neendakara harbour. It is about 10km away from the city center.

Location
Neendakara is 30 km north of Paravur and 14 km south of Karunagappally town.

History
When Portuguese traders settled in Kollam (then Quilon) in the early 16th century, their ships passed through the Neenadakara bar, now the site of Neendakara Bridge, part of National Highway 66, which connects the village to Sakthikulangara across Ashtamudi Lake.

Etymology
In Malayalam, Neendakara means "a long bank".

Norwegian Project
The headquarters of the Indo-Norwegian Fisheries Community project, established in 1953, was based in Neendakara until 1961, when the site was handed over to the Government of Kerala.

See also
Indo-Norwegian Project

References

Villages in Kollam district